Raveendran (Ravindher), popularly known as Disco Raveendran  is an Indian actor, primarily concentrating in Malayalam and Tamil films and he was a very busy actor of both these languages in the 1980s. A multi-faceted personality, Raveendran is also a screenwriter, interior designer, anchor, a film scholar, an acting coach, social activist and director of film festivals like Kochi Metro (Malayalam) Short Film Fest. He is an alumnus of the Adayar film school, Chennai.

Career
Raveendran had his specialisation in acting and passed out from Adayar film institute, Madras in 1979.
He made his feature film debut in the Tamil mega hit Oru Thalai Ragam (1980) and later he acted in 140 films in different languages including Malayalam, Tamil and Telugu. He played the second lead in Kamal Haasan and Rajnikanth movies like Sakalakala Vallavan, Per Sollum Pillai, Ram Lakshman, Ranga, Thankamagan and Pokkiri Raja. Often cited as Disco Raveendran for his dance movements, he concentrated more in Malayalam with I. V. Sasi movies like Ashwaradham, Ee Nadu, John Jaffer Janardhanan, Innalenkil Nale, Sindoora Sandhyakku Mounam, Iniyengilum, Athiratram, Idanilangal, Karimpinpoovinakkare, Rangam, Abhayam Thedi and was a part of numerous hit films until he decided to quit movies. In Tamil, he has also done major roles in Echchil Iravugal, Poikkal Kudhirai, En Priyame and Kutravaaligal. He became a notable film star through his acting in almost 80 superhit films like Ram Lakshman, Sakalakala Vallavan, Ee Nadu, Vasantha azhaippu, Madrasile Mon, Pappayude Swantham Appoos, etc. He did a wide variety of genres like action, romantic, and comedy who has exposed his artistic villain characters and has become a sensation who did equal par roles with the South Indian superstars at his prime.  He has acted in films directed by famous South Indian directors like K. Balachander, S. P. Muthuraman, I. V. Sasi, and Hariharan. He has also worked with big production companies like AVM, Navodaya, Devar Films, Sathya Movies and Dwarakesh.

He came back to films and did smaller roles till 2013 and then played one of the lead roles in Idukki Gold directed by Aashiq Abu and Kili Poyi directed by Vinay Govind. He made his debut as story writer through Sathyan Anthikad's Ennum Eppozhum and is the festival director of Kochi Metro (Malayalam) Short Film Fest.

Raveendran is also an interior designer and has introduced and executed the innovative steel structural space frames of UC College Stadium, Gulfar convention center, Kannamaly and Kothad churches, Kochi and the Petrol bunk at Bakery Junction, Thiruvananthapuram.

Personal life
He is born to Elias and Dr. Saramma at Tripunithura, Kerala, India. He completed 2 years of acting course at South India Film Chambers, Chennai and completed degree course at Film and Television Institute of India, Pune.

He is married to Suma. The couple have three children, Mareena, Bibin and Fabin. His son Fabin has acted in Idukki Gold (film) in Michael's childhood role.

Recognitions
Raveendran has been conducting classes, seminars and festivals on cinema studies, drama, theatre works and short movies. Monsoon Film Fest, a traveling film festival, directed by Ravindhar, has been presented even in Paris.  He has been the director of Peace International Film festival (1995 to 2008), Swaralaya International Film Festival (2007 to 2008) and has conducted various film festivals like Bharathan Film Festival, Padmarajan Festival, Lohithadas Festival, etc. over various universities  in Kerala. He has also presented several programmes about cinema and sports in the major Malayalam television channels such as Asianet and Kairali, premiered a political satire programme in India Vision during the time of general election and has judged dancing reality shows in major TV channels. He has also joined for religious documentaries of Varapuzha and Ernakulam dioceses.

Other achievements

Raveendran has attained his Masters Certificate in Construction Management from the World of Concrete, USA (1996). He has been the convener of Indian Concrete Institute, Kerala (1995-2000) and has had his name highlighted for preparing various structures together with the concepts for Kerala's biggest construction centre, Gulfar. His contributions further stretch the list to Fisheries Department's Hatchery Shed, Bharat Petroleum gas filling station in Trivandrum, churches in Kochi (Kothad and Kalamaserry), etc. The structure design partners of the aforesaid projects were big institutions like Madras IIT, SCRC, and Anna University.

In 1996 The Economic Times reported Raveendran as India's most important building material distributor. He has also secured various medals from Tata Steel, Birla Cement, ACL, LST and other companies. For the first time, Tata's director of sales prepared a 15 page booklet on Raveendran's marketing strategy and sent to all zonal managers in India.

Raveendran is also a well known interior designer in Kerala and has also worked as an interior designer in the Handicraft Development Corporation of Kerala.

Present endeavours

Presently Raveendran is the director of ‘Elias Foundations’ and is conducting film festivals and film appreciation courses in GCC countries and various universities in South India. He has conducted researches on film economics, movie aesthetics and businesses, film culture and technology and is now engaged in writing, directing and producing documentaries for Elias Foundations. Raveendran has been having a great connection with the UAE authorities. Him along with Mohanlal has conducted the first ever UAE national day celebration outside the country of the UAE. He has supervised film festivals and free filmmaking workshops in all the Emirates and has presented seminars in Sharjah International Book Fair about the topics “Visual Literacy” in 2019 and 2022 and “Semiotics of Moving Images” in 2021.

He has also done an interview about his experience undergoing a test for COVID-19 and that has published as an article in the official news agency of the UAE, Emirates News Agency, also known as WAM.

Filmography

Actor

Malayalam

2019 Kettyolaanu Ente Malakha - Bombay Sajeevan
2017 Pashu
2017 Cappuccino 
2015 Njaan Samvidhaanam Cheyyum 
2015 Ennum Eppozham
2014 Ormayundo Ee Mukham - Gautham's father
2014 Vellivelichathil 
2014 Manglish—House keeper
2014 Salala Mobiles---Hawala dealer
2013 Idukki Gold.... Ravi
2013 Kili Poyi --- Disco Douglas
2012 101 Weddings-as policeman 
2011 Oru Nunakkadha - Tamil film director
2009 Swa Le - Ravi Kumar
2006 Notebook - Doctor
2006 Chakkara Muthu
2006 Rashtram
2006 Lanka.... Arun
2005 Bharathchandran I.P.S. - Devan Menon
2005 Chandrolsavam-Doctor
2004 Kadhavaseshan - Sreedevi's husband
1994 Napoleon
1994 Cabinet- Daniel
1993 Customs Diary
1993 Bhoomi Geetham - Vijayan
1993 Uppukandam Brothers
1992 Pappayude Swantham Appoos - Rudran
1992 Mukhamudra (Come Back as negative role)
1987 Aattakkadha 
1986 Ente Shabdham .... Shiva
1986 Abhayam Thedi
1985 Idanilangal.... Maniyan
1985 Thammil Thammil
1985 Aazhi
1985 Karimpin Poovinakkare - Thampi
1985 Rangam ... Madhavan
1984 Velicham Illatha Veedhi
1984 Chakkarayumma..... Vinod
1984 Minimol Vatticanil ... Ravi
1984 Vetta
1984 Poomadathe Pennu
1984 Athirathram - Chandru
1984 Mainakam - Mohan
1983 Attakkalasam  - Santhosh Babu's Friend
1983 Bhookambam - Pramod
1983 Asuran
1983 Eettappuli - Jayan
1983 Theeram Thedunna Thira
1983 Thavalam - Rajan
1983 Paalam
1983 Iniyenkilum - Pradeep
1983 Thimingalam - Venu
1983 Angam
1982 Innalenkil Nale - Ravi
1982 John Jaffer Janardhanan - Jaffer
1982 Sindoora Sandhyakku Mounam - Kumar
1982 Anthiveyilile Ponnu
1982 Bheeman
1982 Ee Nadu .... Prathapan
1982 Veedu .... Ravindran
1982 Arambham
1982 Aasha .... Kabir Mohammed
1982 Kaalam.... Rajan
1982 Velicham Vitharunna Pennkutty
1982 Madrasile Mon
1982 Anuraagakkodathi .... Rajan
1981 Kaahalam
1981 Varanmare Avasyamundu
1980 Ashwaradham
1980 Swantham Enna Padam ... Ravi

Tamil

2015 Kaaki Sattai
2005 6'2
1995 Paattu Vaathiyar
1989 Sandhya Raagam
1988 Aval Mella Sirithal
1987 Per Sollum Pillai
1987 Ival Oru Pournami
1986 Vidinja Kalyanam
1986 Unakkaagave Vaazhgiren
1986 Iravu Pookkal
1986 Mamiyargal Jakkirathai
1985 Kalyana Agathigal...Ambikapathy
1985 Kutravaaligal
1985 Vetrikani
1985 Poove Poochooda Vaa
1985 Thiramai
1984 Achamillai Achamillai
1984 Veetuku Oru Kannagi
1984 Kaval Kaithigal 
1984 Pudhiavan
1984 Vaazhkai
1984 Vai Sollil Veeranadi 
1984 Puyal Kadantha Bhoomi 
1983 En Priyame
1983 Adutha Varisu...Prathap
1983 Poikkal Kudhirai
1983 Kann Sivanthaal Mann Sivakkum (1983)
1983 Thanga Magan
1983 Yudhakaandam 
1982 Echchil Iravugal
1982 Idhayam Pesugirathu
1982 Nandri, Meendum Varuga 
1982 Anal Kaatru
1982 Pokkiri Raja
1982 Ranga...Ravi
1982 Sakalakala Vallavan
1981 Panimalar
1981 Mouna Yuddham 
1981 Kaalam
1981 Ram Lakshman 
1981 Oru Iravu Oru Paravai
1980 Anjatha Nenjangal
1980 Sujatha
1980 Vasantha Azhaippugal 
1980 Oru Thalai Ragam

Writer

References

External links

 
 Raveendran at MSI

Living people
Male actors from Kochi
Male actors in Tamil cinema
Male actors in Malayalam cinema
Indian male film actors
M.G.R. Government Film and Television Training Institute alumni
20th-century Indian male actors
21st-century Indian male actors
Malayalam screenwriters
Screenwriters from Kochi
21st-century Indian dramatists and playwrights
Year of birth missing (living people)
21st-century Indian screenwriters